Transglutaminase 6 is a protein that in humans is encoded by the TGM6 gene.

Function and Clinical Significance 

The protein encoded by this gene belongs to the transglutaminase superfamily. It catalyzes the cross-linking of proteins and the conjugation of polyamines to proteins. Mutations in this gene are associated with spinocerebellar ataxia type 35 (SCA35). Alternatively spliced transcript variants encoding different isoforms have been found for this gene. [provided by RefSeq, Dec 2011].

Mutations in TGM6 cause acute myeloid leukaemia. The presence of antibodies against TG6 is statistically related to gluten ataxia, amongst other conditions.

Model organisms 

Model organisms have been used in the study of TGM6 function. A conditional knockout mouse line called Tgm6tm1a(KOMP)Wtsi was generated at the Wellcome Trust Sanger Institute. Male and female animals underwent a standardized phenotypic screen to determine the effects of deletion. Additional screens performed:  - In-depth immunological phenotyping

References

Further reading